Bob Smith (born April 22, 1940) is a former American football coach. He served as the head football coach at Southeast Missouri State University from 1984 to 1987 and Southern Illinois University Carbondale from 1989 to 1993, compiling a career college football coaching record of 34–64–1.

Smith was the head football coach at Manual High School in Peoria, Illinois from 1973 to 1977. In 1978, he joined the coaching staff at the University of Illinois at Urbana–Champaign and was put in charge of the receivers under head coach Gary Moeller. He remained on the Illinois staff when Mike White took over the program in 1980. By 1983, Smith was coaching the offensive linemen and helped guide the 1983 Illinois Fighting Illini football team to a Big Ten Conference title and an appearance in the 1984 Rose Bowl.

Smith led the Southeast Missouri State Redhawks to a record of 17–26–1 in four seasons. His 1987 squad shared the Missouri Intercollegiate Athletic Association (MIAA) title and Smith was named the conference's coach of the year. In early 1988, he resigned to return to Illinois and join the staff of John Mackovic, who had been hired to succeed White as head coach.

Head coaching record

References

1940 births
Living people
Illinois Fighting Illini football coaches
Southern Illinois Salukis football coaches
Southeast Missouri State Redhawks football coaches
High school football coaches in Illinois